The 1976 Atlanta Falcons season was the franchise's 11th year in the National Football League (NFL). The season saw the Falcons attempting to improve on their 4-10 record from 1975. However, they were only able to match the record, as they finished the 1976 season at 4-10 and missed the playoffs for the 11th straight season. After a 1-4 start to the season, head coach Marion Campbell was fired by general manager Pat Peppler, who himself would close out the season as the interim head coach and finish the season with a 3-6 record. The Falcons also suffered the ignominy of being the only established NFL team to lose to one of the league's two expansion teams when they lost 30-13 to the Seattle Seahawks on November 7.

For the season, the Falcons converted from gray facemasks to white facemasks.

Offseason

Draft

Personnel

Staff

Roster

Regular season

Schedule 

Note: Division opponents are in bold text

Standings

Season summary

Week 2 at Lions

References

External links 
 1976 Atlanta Falcons at Pro-Football-Reference.com

Atlanta Falcons
Atlanta Falcons seasons
Atlanta